The Bongo people may refer to:

 Bongo people (Gabon), western Pygmies
 Bongo people (South Sudan)